Unholier Than Thou is the second album by Infernäl Mäjesty. It was released on August 15, 1998 by Hypnotic Records and released in April 2001 in the USA.

Track listing
  "Unholier Than Thou"   – 4:39
  "The Hunted "  – 4:23  
  "Gone the Way of All Flesh"  – 4:20 
  " Black Infernal World"  – 4:22   
  "Roman Song"  – 5:10 
  "Where Is Your God"  – 4:35  
  "Death Roll"  – 4:38  
  "The Art of War"  – 5:33

Credits
 Chris Bailey– vocals 
 Steve Terror– guitar 
 Kevin Harris – drums
 Kenny Hallman– guitar  
 Chay McMullen – bass

References

Infernäl Mäjesty albums
1998 albums